Balge is a municipality in the district of Nienburg, in Lower Saxony, Germany, located on the Weser river. The community belongs to the Samtgemeinde Weser-Aue which consists of six municipalities including Balge.

History

On March 1, 1974 the community of Balge, Blenhorst, Bötenberg, Buchhorst, Holzbalge, Mehlbergen and Sebbenhausen were merged to form a new municipality called Blenhorst.  The name was officially changed to Balge on January 23, 1976.

Politics 

The local council of governance consists of eleven women counsellors. Including:
 6 SPD seats
 5 seats for members at large from the Balge voting community (as of the election of September 11, 2011).
Barbara King-Meyer (SPD) is honorary mayor from the community of Balge

Culture and Sites of Interest

Sites
 In Blenhorst there is a sawmill and flour mill that has been in operation since 1769.
 In Bötenberg there is a watermill, the Benther Mill,  that was first registered as a grain mill  in 1553.  It is no longer in operation, but was a grain mill and sawmill.
 The village church in Balge with its striking tower was built circa 1300 in Romanesque style.

Sports

The sports club in Balge (SV Sebbenhausen / Balge), sponsors several gun clubs, and two marching bands from individual districts.

Economy and Infrastructure

Education
 Kindergarten in Balge
 Because of strong evidence of projected decrease in school population, (sometimes only five students per year) the closure of the primary school site in Balge was decided in early 2008.

Noteworthy Person

Heinrich Löhmann - (1933 Siebbenhausen). Farmer and author of "Kindheit Auf dem Dorf, Jungend in wechselvoller Zeit"

References

Nienburg (district)